Nicole Rencken (born 12 June 1981) is a former professional tennis player from South Africa.

Career
Rencken was runner-up in the girls' doubles at the 1999 Australian Open, partnering Natalie Grandin.

On the professional circuit, she reached a best singles ranking of 283 and won ten ITF titles in doubles.

Both of her WTA Tour main-draw appearances were in doubles, in Oklahoma City in 2001, and then the following year at the Madrid Open.

From 2002 to 2004, Rencken played nine Fed Cup ties for South Africa, including a World Group Play-off against the Czech Republic in 2003.

ITF Circuit finals

Singles: 1 (runner-up)

Doubles: 18 (10 titles, 8 runner-ups)

See also
 List of South Africa Fed Cup team representatives

References

External links
 
 
 

1981 births
Living people
South African female tennis players
Sportspeople from Durban
White South African people
21st-century South African women